Kamlesh Khunti  is a British physician who is Professor of Primary Care Diabetes and Vascular Medicine at the University of Leicester. His research considers diabetes and public health. During the COVID-19 pandemic, Khunti studied the impact of COVID-19 on people living with diabetes. He served on the Scientific Advisory Group for Emergencies (SAGE). He is the director of the National Institute for Health and Care Research (NIHR) Applied Research Collaboration East Midlands.

Early life and education 
Khunti spent his childhood in Leicester. He studied medicine at the University of Dundee and started working as a General practitioner in Leicester in 1990. He was regularly named as one of the most influential GPs in the United Kingdom.

Research and career 
Khunti specialises in Type 2 diabetes and cardiovascular disease. His career in medical research began in the late nineties. He established the Leicester Diabetes Centre with Melanie Davies. He was elected a Fellow of the Academy of Medical Sciences and a professor at the University of Leicester in 2017. He is particularly focussed on reducing health inequalities. He was awarded the 2019 South Asian Health Foundation's Lifetime Achievement Award for his efforts to enhance the medical outcomes of South Asians. His research informed international guidelines for diabetes screening and management.

Throughout the COVID-19 pandemic, Khunti studied the impact of COVID-19 on people from ethnic minority backgrounds and people living with disabilities. He also studied the effectiveness of various types of face masks or primary health professionals. He served on the independent Scientific Advisory Group for Emergencies from 2020 to 2021.

Khunti was appointed Commander of the Order of the British Empire (CBE) in the 2022 New Year Honours for services to health.

Selected publications

References 

21st-century English medical doctors
British general practitioners
Academics of the University of Leicester
Alumni of the University of Dundee
Commanders of the Order of the British Empire
Living people
Year of birth missing (living people)
People from Leicester
NIHR Senior Investigators